The Falcon's Adventure is a 1946 film. It is the 13th of 16 films about the Falcon and the final film of RKO's Falcon series starring Tom Conway. It was directed by William Berke, who had served as producer for the previous entry in the series, 1946's The Falcon's Alibi.

Plot
Tom Lawrence, known as the Falcon, is about to go on a fishing holiday with his sidekick Goldie Locke, who has convinced him stop thinking of women or crime. However, when he sees a woman abducted in a taxicab, the Falcon rescues her. The woman, Louise Bragaza, tells him that she was the target of kidnappers as her father had invented a process to manufacture synthetic diamonds. The Falcon and Goldie travel to Miami to rescue Louise's father.

Cast
 Tom Conway as Tom Lawrence
 Madge Meredith as Louisa Braganza
 Edward Brophy as Goldie Locke
 Robert Warwick as Kenneth Sutton
 Myrna Dell as Doris Blanding
 Steve Brodie as Benny
 Ian Wolfe as J.D. Denison
 Carol Forman as Helen Ray
 Joseph Crehan as Inspector Cavanaugh
 Phil Warren as Mike Geary
 Tony Barrett as Paolo Ray
 Harry Harvey as Detective Sgt. Duncan
 Jason Robards Sr. as Lieutenant Evans

References

External list
 
 
 
 

1946 films
RKO Pictures films
1946 crime drama films
Films directed by William A. Berke
American crime drama films
American black-and-white films
Films scored by Paul Sawtell
Films with screenplays by Aubrey Wisberg
The Falcon (film character) films
1940s American films
1940s English-language films